The Country Bunny and the Little Gold Shoes is a 1939 children's picture book written by DuBose Heyward and illustrated by Marjorie Flack.

The book, which has never been out of print, has come to be regarded as a feminist and anti-racist statement.

According to James Hutchisson, professor of English at The Citadel, the book is probably based on a story made up by Heyward's mother, Jane Screven DuBose, and told to Heyward when he was a child. Before turning it into a book, Heyward used to tell the story to his own children.

Plot

The book is the story of Cottontail, a small, brown mother bunny who aspires to be an Easter bunny, which, in this telling, is a highly competitive position for which only five bunnies are selected each year. She applies, only to be scorned by the elite Easter bunnies, "big white bunnies who lived in fine houses" who tell her to "go back to the country and eat a carrot."

She returns to the country where "by and by she had a husband and then one day, much to her surprise there were twenty-one Cottontail babies to take care of." She brings them up exceedingly well, teaching them to be responsible, self-reliant and cooperative by requiring them to help in the vegetable garden and with the housework.

She returns to the big city, where she not only aces the Easter-bunny job interview, but becomes one of the most celebrated Easter bunnies of all time, admired for her heroism and the skills she learned rearing 21 little bunnies.

Feminist statement
Caroline Kennedy calls the heroine of Country Bunny her "all-time favorite character" from a childhood book: "I see her now as a woman who re-enters the work force after raising a family — 'leans in,' and does it all — much better than the big Jack Rabbits." Author Francis Itani also remembers it as a childhood favorite in which the Country Bunny "goes on a quest to prove that she (as much as the male bunnies) can be wisest, swiftest and kindest."

References

1939 children's books
American picture books
Holiday-themed children's books
Feminist literature
Easter Bunny
Easter fiction
Books about rabbits and hares